The 1996 Liga Perdana season is the third season of the Liga Perdana (1994–97). A total of 15 teams participated in the season with 14 teams from Malaysia and one foreign team, Brunei.

The season kicked off on 22 March 1996. Sabah dominated the season and ended up winning the title.

Teams

15 teams competing in the third season of Liga Perdana.

 Sabah (1996 Liga Perdana champions)
 Sarawak
 Kedah
 Selangor
 Perlis
 Negeri Sembilan
 Perak
 Kuala Lumpur
 Pahang
 Pulau Pinang
 Kelantan
 Terengganu
 Johor
 Malacca
 Brunei

League Table:-

1.Sabah  - 58 PTS (1996 Liga Perdana Champions)

2.Kedah  - 57 PTS

3.Negeri Sembilan  - 57 PTS

4.Selangor  - 49 PTS

5.Brunei  - 44 PTS

6.Pulau Pinang  - 41 PTS

7.Sarawak  - 40 PTS

8.Perak  - 40 PTS

9.Johor  - 37 PTS

10.Perlis  - 36 PTS

11.Pahang  - 33 PTS

12.Malacca  - 27 PTS

13.Terengganu  - 20 PTS

14.Kuala Lumpur  - 18 PTS

15.Kelantan  - 17 PTS

Champions

References

Liga Perdana (1994–1997) seasons
1
Malaysia